Mac William Otten (December 16, 1925 – December 26, 2015) was an American professional basketball player. Otten was selected in the third round in the 1949 BAA Draft by the Indianapolis Olympians. He played for the Tri-Cities Blackhawks in 1949–50 before being traded to the St. Louis Bombers that season. He ended his BAA/NBA career playing for the Bombers.

Mac Otten is also the brother of Don Otten, another former NBA player. He and Don also became the first pair of brothers to play together for a single team in the NBA with the Blackhawks.

Career statistics

NBA
Source

Regular season

References

External links
 Stats @ Basketball-reference.com

1925 births
2015 deaths
American men's basketball players
Basketball players from Ohio
Bowling Green Falcons men's basketball players
Centers (basketball)
Forwards (basketball)
Indianapolis Olympians draft picks
People from Bellefontaine, Ohio
St. Louis Bombers (NBA) players
Tri-Cities Blackhawks players
Waterloo Hawks players